Flores is the capital of the Petén Department, Guatemala's landlocked, northernmost  department. The population is 13,700 (2003).

Flores is the seat of the municipality of Flores (population 22,600).

Its Catedral Nuestra Señora de Los Remedios y San Pablo Itzá is the cathedral episcopal see of the Apostolic Vicariate of El Petén (formerly a territorial prelature).

The old part of the city is located on an island on Lake Petén Itzá, connected to the mainland by a short causeway.  On the mainland is the suburb Santa Elena and, to the West, the contiguous municipality of San Benito. The municipality of Flores also includes a wide swathe of rural territory stretching north from Lake Petén Itzá to the Mexican border.

History 
In Pre-Columbian times, Flores was the Maya city of Nojpetén.

Nojpetén 

The Itza left the Yucatán region in the 13th century and built the city later known as Tayasal as their capital. They called it Nojpetén, (noj peten, literally "Great Island" in the Itza language). The Spanish called it Tayasal, possibly derived from ta Itza, or "Place of the Itza".

It was here, on the island of Flores on the shore of Lake Petén Itzá, that the last independent Maya state held out against the Spanish conquerors. In 1541, Hernán Cortés came to the island, en route to Honduras, but needed to move on and did not try to conquer it.

The Spanish did not manage to conquer the island until 1697, when they marched in, attacked via boats, and destroyed it. Those who could flee did so, and many Itzá people hid in the jungle for years. From the ruins of Nojpetén arose the modern city of Flores. The modern city can thus be regarded as the second oldest continuously inhabited settlement in the Americas, after Cholula.

Climate 
Flores has a tropical monsoon climate (Köppen Am) with year-round high temperatures. It has a lengthy wet season stretching from May to January, and a relatively brief dry season from February to April. As is typical with most monsoon climates, there is also some rainfall in the dry season, albeit significantly lighter. Daytime highs generally hover in the  range for most of the year, falling slightly to between  during the winter months. The hottest temperatures are observed just prior to the onset of the wet season, often rising above .

Transportation 
Flores is served by Mundo Maya International Airport. Several international flights land here but most stop first at Guatemala City's La Aurora International Airport. The Island is also very well connected by bus, with many companies running overnight buses to Guatemala City.

Gallery

Flores in the 19th century 
The first photographs ever made from Flores were those taken by engineer Claudio Urrutia in 1897, when he was in charge of the Guatemala-Mexico Border Commission.

Flores in the 21st century

See also 

 Spanish conquest of Petén
 Spanish conquest of Guatemala
  Spanish conquest of Yucatán

References

Bibliography

External links 

 Photos of Flores, Guatemala

Municipalities of the Petén Department
Islands of Guatemala